Maria da Graça Xuxa Meneghel (born Maria da Graça Meneghel, 27 March 1963) is a Brazilian television host, film actress, singer, model, and businesswoman. Known as "Queen of Little Ones", Xuxa built the largest Latin American children's entertainment empire. In the early 1990s, she presented television programs in Brazil, Argentina, Spain and the United States simultaneously, reaching around 100 million viewers daily.

She became a national superstar when she moved to TV Globo in 1986 for the Xou da Xuxa. She was the first Brazilian to appear on Forbes magazine's list of richest artists in 1991, taking 37th place with an annual gross income of US$19 million.

Over her 30-year career, Xuxa has sold over 30 million copies of her records worldwide, which makes her the highest-selling Brazilian female singer. Her net worth was estimated at US$100 million in the early 1990s. As of 2020, she continues to be among Brazil's most prominent celebrities. Also successful as a businesswoman, she has the highest net worth of any Brazilian female entertainer, estimated at US$400 million.

Biography

Early life 

Maria da Graça Meneghel was born in Santa Rosa, Rio Grande do Sul, to Luís Floriano Meneghel and Alda Meneghel (née Alda Flores da Rocha). Xuxa is of Italian and Polish descent by paternal side and of German, Swiss, Dutch and Portuguese descent by maternal side. Her paternal great-great-grandfather (Ettore Meneghel) emigrated to Brazil at the end of the 1800s from the northern Italian town of Cison di Valmarino, in the region of Veneto. In 2013, Xuxa obtained Italian citizenship by descent.

During Xuxa's birth, her father was told that both mother and child were at risk. He opted to save his wife, and prayed to Our Lady of Graces, promising to name his daughter after the Blessed Virgin Mary if all went well. Although she was named for the Virgin as promised, Xuxa, the youngest member of the Meneghel family, received her famous nickname from her brother, Bladimir. When their mother arrived home with the baby, she said to him: "Look at the baby that I bought to play with you," he replied: "I know, it's my Xuxa." The nickname stuck, though it was not until 1988 that she officially changed her name to Maria da Graça Xuxa Meneghel.

Xuxa spent her early years in her hometown Santa Rosa. When she was seven, she and her family moved to Rio de Janeiro where they lived in the Bento Ribeiro neighborhood.

At 15 years old, she was discovered by a modeling agency, and began her professional career as a model at 16. During this time period Xuxa modeled in Brazil and the United States for both fashion and men's magazines, such as Playboy, and began a famous love affair with Brazilian football star Pelé. In 1984, she was hired as a model by Ford Models.

Media career

1983–86: Rede Manchete 
Established as national beauty and sex symbol, Xuxa got the chance to move toward a career in television through an offer to host a small regional children's program, Clube da Criança for Rede Manchete. In this period, she worked as a model during the week in New York City and was taping her show during the weekend in Brazil. In 1986 this opportunity was expanded when she received an offer to host a national children's program through the multimedia conglomerate Globo.

1986–92: Xou da Xuxa and breakthrough 

On 30 June 1986, Xou da Xuxa debuted on TV Globo. It aired in the mornings from Monday to Saturday until its final episode on 31 December 1992, after some 2,000 episodes. Xuxa would usually enter on a pink ship, which awakened in the children the dream of flying beside her. Children from all over Brazil ran to have breakfast with the song "Quem Qué Pão?" She would end the show with the famous "Xuxa kiss", where she would put on bright lipstick and kiss the children onstage with her and children in the audience on the cheek, leaving a mark. In addition to entertainment, she also aired positive messages to the public, such as "Want, Power and Reach!", "Believe in Dreams", "Drugs do Bad" and many others. In Christmas 1986, Xuxa received her eighth platinum record, a prize awarded to every 250,000 copies sold. The album Xou da Xuxa, from the record company Som Livre, had sold more than two million copies so far, achieving by then the South American record for a single album. Xuxa sold more than Brazilian singer Roberto Carlos that year. In the following years, the presenter still released six more albums of the series, such as Xou da Xuxa 2 and 3, which established themselves as the best-selling albums in Brazil so far, with 2.7 and 3.3 million copies sold, respectively. With the recorded songs, it left in tours by Brazil that were seen by millions of people.

In 1987, the French newspaper Libération includes Xuxa in the list of 10 women of prominence on the planet, next to the British prime minister Margaret Thatcher. In the same period, Xuxa began a love relationship with the Brazilian driver Formula 1, Ayrton Senna, who died in 1994. In parallel to the Xou da Xuxa, the presenter commanded Bobeou Dançou, between 9 July and 31 December 1989, on Sunday afternoons of TV Globo. Initially created as Xou of Xuxa frame, it was so successful that the station decided to launch it as an independent program aimed at the adolescent public. The Bobeou Dançou was a program of rumba based on riddles with two teams formed by adolescents between 13 and 17 years disputed the first place of the competition.

In 1990, a new record: the film Lua de Cristal, its biggest box office hit, sold 4,178 million tickets and ranks 21st in the ranking of most-watched national films from 1970 to 2011 according to Ancine (Agência Nacional do Cinema). Xuxa accumulates the highest-grossing of Brazilian cinema, more than 37 million people watched her films. Also this year by the International Academy of Television Arts and Sciences of the United States to deliver the International Emmy Awards in the category of best children's program and to present one of their songs in the awards party. In 1991, Xuxa appeared in 37th place for Forbes among the 40 richest celebrities of that year, with a turnover of $19 million. Xuxa was the first Brazilian to join the list. The Paradão da Xuxa emerged as an independent program after the success of the picture of the same name presented in Xou of Xuxa. The program was aired between 25 April and 26 December 1992 on Saturday mornings of TV Globo, replacing Xou of Xuxa on that day. The attraction was three hours long, and different singers and musical groups performed on the show. The musical selection went from the samba to the rock, going through the sertanejo music. On the last Saturday of each month, Super Paradão (Vacation Specials) was shown, highlighting the most successful songs of the period.

1991–93: International career 
After reaching success with her record sales in Brazil, Xuxa released her first Spanish-language album, Xuxa 1, which performed well in the Argentine market. Xuxa widened her appeal among Spanish-speaking audiences when she recorded a program in Argentina, called El Show de Xuxa. The Los Angeles Times reported in 1992 that "more than 20 million Spanish- and Portuguese-speaking children watched El Show de Xuxa in 16 countries of Latin America every day, as well as Univision in the United States. The first two seasons of the show, the most popular, were produced by Argentine TV channel Telefé while the third season, in 1993, was produced independently and then sold for broadcast to El Trece. Her last Spanish speaking show aired in Latin America on 31 December 1993.

The New York Times highlighted her success in Brazil and Argentina in an article by correspondent, James Brooke. The publication highlighted the record sales of albums of the singer, which in 1990 reached 12 million copies, and its success in the Hispanic market, where it reached 300,000 copies with their first album in Spanish. At the time, she was called by New York magazine as "Latin American Madonna". In 1992, the Los Angeles Times said that Xuxa was "probably better known to most Latin American pre-adolescents than Michael Jackson." Not only was she successful in America, but in Europe as well. In 1992, taping programs in Brazil and Argentina, Xuxa was invited to hosted the program Xuxa Park, in Spain. Released by Telecinco channel, the game show was shown on Sundays, with high ratings. The show lasted two years. The theme song of the show, Sabor de la Vida, had huge success in Spain, being among the 100 most played in the European Hot 100 Singles. Her Xuxa Park album also sold well for 8 weeks and was certified gold. Billboard magazine published in September 1992, that the album Xuxa 2 was at the top of the Spanish charts, and appeared in position 77 of the 100 most sold albums in the world. The biggest hits on this disc were: Loquita Por Ti (#29 on the billboard chart), Luna de Cristal (#35 on the billboard chart) and Chindolele (#10 on the billboard chart). The album reached the fifth position in the U.S. Billboard Top Latin Albums of 1991. In 1992, People magazine chose Xuxa as one of the 50 most beautiful people in the world.

In 1993, Xuxa hosted an English-language series in the United States titled Xuxa (which was produced by MTM Enterprises). However, it did not achieve the popularity she had enjoyed throughout Brazil, Latin America and Spain, and was cancelled after one season due to low ratings. It was initially broadcast by 124 stations across the country. The shows were produced on Sound Stage 36 at CBS Television City in Los Angeles. Sixty-five episodes were taped for the first season of the show. Taping of the episodes was done in a 5-week period in the summer of 1993. The shows were broadcast Monday through Friday, generally in the early morning or mid-afternoon. All 65 episodes were broadcast during the initial 13 weeks before there was a repeat. Helping Xuxa on the show were the Pixies (three U.S. "Paquitas" plus one Brazilian Paquita), the Mellizas (uncredited), Jelly, Jam, and ten "child wranglers" for 150 kids on the set. Starting in September 1994, Xuxa began airing on The Family Channel cable network, at 8:00 am ET/PT. They reprised original episodes on a new children's block until 19 February 1996 when Xuxa stopped airing on The Family Channel. The show was sold to other countries including Japan, Israel, Russia, Australia, Romania and some Arab states. Her international ambitions apparently ended after the grueling taping schedule for her American show. She was hospitalized for several days due to exhaustion, and decided to give up her international career. In the U.S., Sony Wonder has released two of her videos and a record that includes English translations of some of her most successful songs in Portuguese and Spanish.

1994–2000: Weekend shows 

The presenter returned to her children's audience with Xuxa Park, the Brazilian version of a project of the same name that commanded in Spain. Xuxa's triumphant entrances continued, in one of the stages, she stepped out of a pyramid. In the last segment of the program, Xuxa arrived in her iconic spaceship. The program directed by Marlene Mattos gathered pictures, jokes and musical attractions was exhibited between 4 June 1994 and 6 January 2001 on Saturday mornings of TV Globo. The attraction was canceled abruptly due to the tragic fire that occurred on 11 January 2001 in the recording of its carnival special.

In parallel to Xuxa Park, Xuxa commanded Xuxa Hits between 8 January and 16 April 1995 on Sunday afternoons on TV Globo. The program came as a picture of Xuxa Park, but has become an independent program due to its great success. In attraction, Xuxa received several musical attractions like bands, DJs and singers. After its end, the program returned to be only a painting of the Xuxa Park.

Inspired by Xuxa Hits, the Planeta Xuxa was created, which premiered on 5 April 1997 and immediately became a fever among those who grew up following Xuxa's career. Initially, Planeta Xuxa was shown on TV Globo's Saturday afternoons, so Xuxa presented two shows simultaneously on the same day, as Xuxa Park occupied the broadcasters' mornings. As of 19 April 1998, the program began to be presented on Sunday afternoons due to the 1998 World Cup, remaining on Sundays until its end in 2002. Planeta Xuxa was focused on the performances of musicians and bands. The program had the format of a discoteque, had the participation of the public and received famous guests. The attraction came to an end on 28 July 2002, due to the desire of Xuxa to return to children's television and the end of the partnership with the director Marlene Mattos.

2001–14: Xuxa no Mundo da Imaginação and TV Xuxa 

As a mother, Xuxa noticed a shortage of videos for small children. In 2001, she designed the Só Para Baixinhos audiovisual and the CD and DVD set. The album Só Para Baixinhos 2 received worldwide recognition and won the 2002 Latin Grammy Award for Best Latin Children's Album category. With the success of the Xuxa project for Baixinhos, which was aimed at children 0–10 years old, the presenter had the desire to create a program in this educational mold, and on 28 October 2002 she debuted Xuxa no Mundo da Imaginação. The show was broadcast on Monday mornings of TV Globo, marking the return of the presenter the broad daily of the station after the end of Xou da Xuxa. The attraction, about 40 minutes long, was divided into four blocks and had 32 frames displayed alternately throughout the week. Through computer graphics capabilities, Xuxa appeared seated on a globe with a blue background filled with white clouds, and featured 14 pictures that blended entertainment and didactic elements. After many reformulations to reverse the low audience, the program came to an end on 31 December 2004. In 2003, Xuxa was nominated again to Grammy for Xuxa Só Para Baixinhos 3 and took the second trophy in the same category. On 30 June 2003, she inaugurated an amusement park with her name. Mundo de Xuxa, located in São Paulo, in an area of 12,000 square meters, was the largest indoor amusement park in Latin America and has more than 18 attractions. The Mundo do Xuxa is part of the group of 3 amusement parks that most invoice in Brazil, together the 3 parks made about R$220 million per year. In 2004, for the third consecutive time, she competed with the video Xuxa Só Para Baixinhos 4 in the same category. The 5th edition, Xuxa Circus, became a huge-selling success and was transformed into a show that dragged crowds into theaters. In 2005, the Xuxa Festa, promoted a remix of old hits. The project pleased both the children and the parents who grew up following her career. In 2012, Xuxa is again present in the Latin Grammy as the only Brazilian in the Best Children's Album category, with XSPB 11. This is already the fifth indication of the Xuxa Só Para Baixinhos series.

After successive audience defeats with Xuxa no Mundo da Imaginação, TV Globo reformulated again the attraction commanded by Xuxa that changed its name and age group and on 4 April 2005, it premiered TV Xuxa. The program had two distinct phases and the first was broadcast on Monday morning to the children's audience in a mix of play, dramaturgy, competition, cartoons and musical numbers presentation. The name of the program was an allusion to the fictional TV Xuxa, a television station with several attractions. After many changes for not being able to keep the station in the isolated leadership, the program no longer aired on 31 December 2007. With the success of XSPB, Xuxa released in Argentina, in 2005, the Xuxa audiovisual Solamente para Bajitos. In parallel to TV Xuxa, the presenter commanded Conexão Xuxa between 2 December 2007 and 11 January 2008. The program had four teams formed by three people (one athlete, one personality and one teenager). Together, they faced various kinds of physical evidence and general knowledge in beautiful settings in the country. The program lasted three stages. The teams were divided by colors: yellow, green, blue and orange. The four teams disputed an X of gold, that was worth three points; an X of silver, worth two; or a bronze X, which was worth one point. In all, there were three stages, displayed in seven editions. The two winners of the first stage and the two winners of the second disputed the final of the program. Vencia the group that obtains more points throughout the competition. TV Xuxa returned to TV Globo grid on 10 May 2008, totally refurbished, aimed at the whole family. With new format and schedule, and different attractions, it became a weekly auditorium program, screened on Saturdays at 10 am. The show ceased to show cartoons, invested in jokes, and Xuxa went on to receive her guests on a stage designed for interviews and musical numbers. In 2009 Xuxa released the film Xuxa em O Mistério de Feiurinha, telling what happens to the princesses after the "Happily Ever After". The film starred Sasha Meneghel in theaters and featured the participation of Hebe Camargo, Luciano Szafir, Luciano Huck, Angelica and others. The film took more than 1,300,000 people to the movies and was released in Brazil, the United States and Angola. In the musical career, Xuxa left to Som Livre, signing with Sony Music. It is estimated that the contract value was R$10 million. Xuxa released the 9th title of the Xuxa Só Para Baixinhos series, titled Natal Mágico and in 2010 the tenth edition of XSPB, entitled Baixinhos, Bichinhos e Mais, the album sold, in one month, the amount necessary to become the best-selling DVD of 2010 in Brazil. In October 2010 Xuxa gave an interview explaining its break with "Free Sound" the presenter claimed that her then record company, was providing a tight budget for the size of its projects. Also in 2010, Xuxa was chosen as favourite Brazilian singer by the readers of the Argentine newspaper Clarín.

In April 2011, she launched Mundo da Xuxa program on TV Globo Internacional. The attraction was shown to Brazilian subscribers on every continent from Monday to Friday and shows the best moments of her career on Globo, as well as clips from XSPB. With success in the mornings, the program TV Xuxa was transferred to the afternoons of Saturday in 2011, replacing the Session of Saturday, that suffered to leave the transmitter in the isolated leadership. TV Xuxa finally came to an end on 25 January 2014, due to the health problems of the presenter. In May 2014, after five years in Sony Music, Xuxa returned to Som Livre. In a press release, the label corrected one of the main mistakes in the company's history: "not to keep one of the country's greatest artists."

2015–present: TV Globo exit and new phase 
On 5 March 2015, after 29 years with TV Globo and off air for over a year with the end of TV Xuxa, Xuxa signed on with Rede Record. Xuxa and TV Globo had amicably broken their contract in December 2014. The arrival of Xuxa in the headquarters of the station was transmitted live by the Program of the Tarde, the station organized one of the biggest events of its history with several links with the fans in the door of its headquarters, in São Paulo, the movement of the employees and the signing of a contract with the presence of the high dome of the broadcaster and journalists of various media, at a press conference specially set up for the blonde at the Teatro Record. This was considered one of the biggest signings in the history of the transmitter, according to sites specialized in TV.

After much speculation as to what it would be and at what time it would be screened, the presenter premiered Xuxa Meneghel, a show of the same name, on 17 August 2015 on RecordTV's Monday night. The program, screened directly from RecNov, was inspired by The Ellen DeGeneres Show, and blended entertainment, fun, excitement, humor, musical attractions, interviews, games and special features. The attraction also opened space for the viewer to interact through social networks. Its last episode aired on 19 December 2016.

After having its release postponed several times, Som Livre launched in December 2016, the thirteenth volume of Xuxa Só Para Baixinhos. Recorded in 2014, and expected to be released in September 2016, XPSB 13 earned Xuxa a Latin Grammy nomination, but because it was released after the deadline, it was disqualified by the Latin Recording Academy.

On 3 April 2017, Xuxa debuted the program Dancing Brasil, a Brazilian version of the American program Dancing with the Stars, produced by Endemol Shine and shown by RecordTV.

Recently, Xuxa announced the national launch of their new tour of shows, titled XuChá, and based on the traditional tea Chá da Alice.

On 6 February 2019, Xuxa also debuted the program The Four Brasil, a Brazilian version of the American program The Four, also produced by the Endemol Shine Group and also shown by RecordTV.

Career in music 
In 1986, the album Xou da Xuxa, sold over two million copies, breaking the South American record for sales, earning eight platinum awards (granted every 250,000 copies sold). In the following years, Xuxa launched six discs, including Xou da Xuxa 2 and Xou da Xuxa 3, and recorded two LPs with the songs translated into Spanish, which sold 2.4 million copies.

From 1989 to 1996, Xuxa had sold 18 million albums, a record in Latin American music sales. Xuxa recorded about 915 songs, recorded 28 albums that together have sold over 45 million copies, and were awarded 400 gold records in Brazil. The album, Xou da Xuxa 3, had more than 3,216,000 copies sold, making it the best-selling children's album, according to the Guinness Book.

In 2002, Veja magazine named Xuxa the richest artist in Brazil, with an estimated net worth of $250 million. According to the same magazine, Xuxa's earnings were comparable to Hollywood stars like Julia Roberts and Keanu Reeves. She was first in the list of artists with highest sales over the past ten years (1998–2008).

The music video, Xuxa só para Baixinhos sold over eight million copies, and won five nominations and two Latin Grammy awards for "Best Children's Album".

In 2012, the Associação Brasileira dos Produtores de Discos (ABPF) released the list of the best-selling DVDs in the country. According to ABPD, Xuxa had two DVDs among the top ten in 2011, XSPB Volume 1–8 (sixth place) and XSPB 11 (ninth).

Social activism 

In September 2011, Colombian singer, Shakira, and Xuxa joined forces through their respective charitable foundations to aid children younger than six years old who live in Brazil's poorest communities. The two artists, together with Brazilian government officials, signed an accord in Rio de Janeiro for a program of cooperation. In its first four years, it plans to provide better access to education to children from 100 schools in Brazil.

Xuxa is the godmother and poster girl of the campaign "Tri-national to Combat Sexual Exploitation of Children and Adolescents" which aims to encourage people to report cases of exploitation and abuse of minors living on the border between Brazil, Paraguay, and Argentina. Since May 2013, the campaign has integrated the actions of several groups: the Itaipu Dam, the International Labour Organization (ILO), the Municipal Tourism Council, Childhood and Youth, Ministry of Labor and Employment, and entities of Paraguay and Argentina who work in the same area.

In May 2014, then-President Dilma Rousseff signed a law that applied stronger penalties to the crime of sexual exploitation of children and adolescents. When asked about criticism from some parents about how they will educate their children after the passage of this law, Xuxa said that they can educate, but without violence: "We have to show that people can and should educate without violence".

Personal life

Fortune and investments
At the age of 16, she began to model professionally. Years later, the affair with soccer player Pelé boosted her profile and in 1982 Xuxa already was considered one of the main publicity figures of the country, announcing from underwear to residential buildings. In the same year she obtained a supporting role in the soap opera Elas por Elas at Globo TV and over time had more of a role in the telenovela.

Also in 1982 Xuxa founded her first company, Xuxa Produções, a legal entity that takes care of the brand of Xuxa and holds, exclusively, the rights to commercialize the use of the brand and image of the artist, nationally and internationally, and represents the artist in contracts in any area. However, in 1993 Xuxa Produções was responsible for the coming of the Dangerous World Tour, from Michael Jackson to Brazil and has performed in other segments without the presence of Xuxa, as the co-production of films by Renato Aragão, Angelica and Father Marcelo Rossi.

At the age of 20, in 1983, Xuxa was invited to present the Clube da Criança in the extinct TV Manchete. During this time, she worked as a model during the week in New York City, and recorded the show on weekends. However, the agency made her choose between career photos and walkways as a model or TV and Xuxa opted for the television show. With the success of audience of the program and the album Xuxa e Seus Amigos, which sold 500,000 copies, Xuxa was contracted by Globo TV and Som Livre. In the same year Xuxa founded the brand O Bicho Comeu, responsible for the commercialization of clothes and accessories for children.

With the initial salary at Globo TV of US$40,000, Xuxa had several increases in its salary, which in 1987 had already reached one million dollars. Also in 1987 she founded "Beijinho Beijinho Produções", responsible for the co-production of television programs and albums. Until 1988, the companies of Xuxa were run by her father, retired soldier Luís Floriano Meneghel, mother, Alda, and brothers Cirano, Bladimir and Solange. That year, Marlene Mattos, director of her program and lawyer Luiz Cláudio Moreira took over the companies. The Xuxa film series premiered for theaters the same year, with the film Super Xuxa contra Baixo Astral, which was watched by more than 2.8 million viewers. That year the artist's fortune was over R$50 million. In 1989 Xuxa already shared with Hebe Camargo the title of highest-paid host of Latin America, receiving only in the Globe TV US$1.5 million monthly. This year, she bought the "MG Meneghel" farm in Rio Bonito, Rio de Janeiro, which had three million square meters and had 50 mango trees and 200 dairy cattle. Also in 1989, the activities of the Xuxa Meneghel Foundation, which carries out four social development programs (Program for Networks and Political Incidence, Program for Socio-educational Actions, Integrated Assistance Program and the Institutional Partnerships Program) began.

In 1990 Xuxa had already reached the mark of 12 million records sold, which had generated a turnover of more than $110 million, of which 20% was destined for it. The 1990 movie Lua de Cristal, was watched by more than 5 million viewers and generated a profit of $5 million for Xuxa Productions. Also in 1990 she founded "Xuxa International Corporation", based in the Cayman Islands, a well-known tax haven, responsible for collecting royalties and royalties around the world. Xuxa's royalties varied between 5% and 20% of the final profit from the sale of products licensed under its brand. Xuxa made a final profit of $19 million in 1990, resulting in her 37th appearance on Forbes list of "Top 40 Most Enlightened Celebrities" in 1991, the first Latin American to appear on the list. The magazine reported that her fortune had already surpassed that of Madonna and was equated with that of Arnold Schwarzenegger.

Also in the year 1990, Xuxa bought a site in Vargem Grande, in Rio de Janeiro for two million dollars. The property underwent several renovations so that it could be the official residence of Xuxa, with mini zoo and nursery, heated pool with waterfall, main house (1050 m2, two floors and five suites with closet), guest house (280 m2), Japanese restaurant (195 m2 bar, industrial kitchen and laundry), fitness center (196 m2), party room (540 m2), recording studio (60 m2), sauna (com 62 m2), house of the employees (283 m2), old house of the caretaker (63 m2), support cellar (67 m2), linen and storage (306 m2), garage for eight cars and helipad. With a total of 78,000 square meters, Xuxa traveled with the golf carts and this one was a refuge for the artist, which did not prevent that fans slept in the entrance of the site waiting for Xuxa. The site was called Casa Rosa was a frequent figure in television programs and specialized magazines, consequently gaining space in the popular culture, arriving to be called Brazilian "Neverland". In 2007, with the concern of providing a social life closer to normal to her daughter Sasha, Xuxa put the site up for sale for $8 million. However, the presenter has not yet been able to sell the property, which is still part of its equity. Still in 1990 Xuxa acquired an apartment of five million dollars in New York, that still forms part of the artist's patrimony and took advantage of the opening of the Brazilian market to imported vehicles to found the Shine Car, concessionaire of imported luxury cars based in Rio de Janeiro. With a partnership with Grendene, Xuxa sold 4 million sandals in Brazil, 1 million in the United States, 1 million in Mexico and 500,000 in the rest of Latin America only in 1990.

In 1991 she began her international career as a television presenter, launching the show El Show de Xuxa by Telefe, Argentina. The program was retransmitted to 17 countries in Latin America and the United States. Between 1991 and 1992 Xuxa received $1 million a month for work on the Argentine broadcaster. She launched the Xuxa Meneghel Models Course in Rio de Janeiro, with a duration of seven months and a load of six hours a week, tuition starting from $60. Also in 1991 Xuxa intensified the licensing of products with her brand and even sold 1.5 million sandals in the United States. She bought five luxury apartments in São Paulo and Rio de Janeiro, which earned $200,000 in rent.

In 1992 Xuxa signed a contract with the Spanish television network Telecinco for 15 episodes of the Xuxa Park program, receiving $240,000 per episode. Only TV Globo, Telefe and Telecinco Xuxa received more than $3.4 million monthly. In May 1992, Xuxa's estate was estimated at US$100 million by People, making it the second-richest artist in Brazil until then, with the same patrimony of Roberto Carlos and behind Silvio Santos. In the same year she founded Light Beam Corporation to license her brand exclusively in the United States, selling this year, among other products, 500,000 dolls. Xuxa made 12 advertising campaigns a year, earning $200,000 each. Xuxa made a final profit of $27 million in 1992, resulting in her return to the list of "40 celebrities who grew richer in the last year" by Forbes in 1993, this time in 28th place. Between 1986 and 1992 Xuxa had sold 18 million discs, which had generated a revenue of over $175 million, of which 20% was destined for Xuxa. Xuxa's Xuxa program produced four tours, including Xuxa's Xuxa 89 tour, in which Xuxa's cache was over $300,000, with a production schedule that involved ten trucks, 60 air tickets, two wagons, two 25-ton stages with more than 150 people involved.

In 1993 she premiered the Xuxa program in the United States, in English. The program was broadcast by more than 100 relays in the country, including CBS and Freeform, and was also sold to more than 120 countries. Through the program, Xuxa received $7 million and launched products in more than 100 countries. So that she could rest between the recordings of the show, Xuxa bought a mansion in Calabasas, Califórnia. In September 1999 the residence was bought by the singer and American actress Brandy Norwood, for $1.7 million. In the year of 1993 Xuxa handled $220 million only in licenses. At the end of this year, a problem in the spine made her slow down. In 1994, the death of Ayrton Senna also contributed to Xuxa diminishing her work rate gradually. Also that year, she bought a mansion on Star Island in Miami for $15 million. The mansion had already belonged to Madonna and is owned by Xuxa until the present time. A tourist boat ride, titled Rich and Famous Tour, includes the Xuxa mansion in the script. In present values, a mansion in the island has the minimum price of $65 million.

On her 33rd birthday she won a Ferrari F355 from her manager Marlene Matos. In 1996 they realized the tour Tô de Bem com a Vida, with more than 45 concerts and a cache of $350,000. In that same year the international press announced that Xuxa is concerned about having little private life. In October, she announced that she would soon leave her career to try to be a mother through artificial insemination, which did not happen because Xuxa had to meet contractual deadlines, which did not prevent the artist from again slowing down the work pace. In November its patrimony was estimated at $300 million. Also in 1996 she founded Lar's Empreendimentos, responsible for real estate investments and the creation of the O Mundo da Xuxa park in 2003.

In 2000 she acquired a million-dollar home in Celebration, Florida, near Walt Disney World. In 2005, an 11-year-old girl, daughter of friends of Xuxa, passed away in the parks of Disney while she was lodged in the house of Xuxa.

In 2002 they acquired a coverage of four suites for R$13 million in São Conrado, in the city of Rio de Janeiro. In 2008 part of the cover caught fire when Xuxa, Sasha and Luciano Szafir were in the property. Luciano was taken to the hospital with a degree of intoxication by the great smoke that quickly spread. According to the magazine Veja, also in 2002, Xuxa had $250 million in equity referring only to real estate. The year 2002 was also marked by the professional breakup of Xuxa and Marlene Mattos, who left the command of the holding company of Xuxa, by reducing their salary at Globo TV to $1 million a month, which lasted until their exit of the issuer, and the foundation of the company Espaço Laser, in which Xuxa owns 51% of participation. It ended the year with 200 licensed products and monthly sales of R$30 million.

In 2003, she bought the Gugu Park at the SP Market mall in São Paulo and transformed it into the Xuxa Mundo O Mundo amusement park. Xuxa bought the park for $15 million. The park made about R$10 million a year.

In 2007, when she left to live in Casa Rosa, Xuxa moved to a residence that had been built in the Malibu Condominium in Barra da Tijuca. The 1,700-square-meter, three-storey mansion is valued at R$10 million.

In 2009, Lar's Empreendimentos of Xuxa was ordered to pay an indemnity of R$50,000 for moral and material damages in legal proceedings.

In November 2010 Xuxa did not agree to the increase in rent of the building which the Shine Car company occupied and took the company to court, but lost the action, leaving the property and extinguishing Shine Car in January 2011. Also in January 2011 Xuxa won a $150,000 lawsuit against Folha Universal, which had stated in 2008 that the artist "was Satanist and would have sold her soul to the devil for $100 million."

In 2012 Xuxa received R$2 million to participate in an advertising campaign of beauty products brand Wella, changing the color of her hair, appearing brunette for the first time in her career. The amount was donated to the Xuxa Meneghel Foundation.

In 2013 TV Bandeirantes was condemned by the Superior Court of Justice (STJ) to pay an indemnity of 1.1 million reais to the presenter. The STJ ruled that Xuxa appeared naked on the station's show in 2008. The images had been published by Playboy before Xuxa launched herself as a children's show host in the early 1980s. The STJ, therefore, rejected the request of the issuer to rediscuss the amount of compensation established by the Court of Justice of Rio de Janeiro (TJRJ) in 2011. Also in 2013 Xuxa bought an island in Angra dos Reis, for R$12.7 million.

In 2014 RecordTV was ordered to pay R$100,000 to Xuxa. The broadcaster was sued for broadcasting photos of the hostess in an essay performed for Playboy in the 1980s without authorization during the Gugu Liberato in 2012.

In February 2015, Xuxa refused a proposal of renewal with Globo TV, since its salary would happen to be 1 million dollars monthly, that received from 2002, to R$250,000, without next projects to return to present a program. In the same month, the O Mundo da Xuxa came to an end, since the place would have to go through new investments in attractions and layout, to meet the need to expand the shopping center in which it was, which would not be viable that due to the Brazilian economic crisis; the park had a final profit of R$4 million in 2014, against R$10 million in 2008. It was sold to Parque da Mônica for R$40 million. In March Xuxa signed with RecordTV for R$1 million monthly. If the program leaves the grid of the station, Xuxa will receive $250,000 monthly. In that same year the Laser Space earned R$50 million. Xuxa, as a businesswoman, had a final profit of $160 million from her companies.

In 2016, Espaço Laser earned R$60 million, expanding its operations to 187 units in Brazil. Xuxa, as a businesswoman, made a final profit of R$200 million with her holding company in 2016. In the same year, she launched herself as a YouTuber.

The company of children's parties—Casa X—of the presenter earned R$17 million in 2017, a 50% increase in one year.

The equity of Xuxa and her companies is valued at US$1 billion, making her one of the richest women in Brazil. Xuxa is a vegan.

Relationships and children
Xuxa has one daughter with actor Luciano Szafir, Sasha, who was born in 1998. Xuxa dated Brazilian football legend Pelé in the 1980s, and later Formula 1 legend, Ayrton Senna.

She reported in 2012 that reclusive singer Michael Jackson had once courted her, inviting her to dinner at Neverland Ranch and his manager asked whether she would consider bearing his children. She is in a relationship with actor and singer Junno Andrade pt. In 2013, her Italian nationality was recognized.

Filmography

Television

Films

Discography 

 Xuxa e Seus Amigos (1985)
 Xou da Xuxa (1986)
 Xegundo Xou da Xuxa (1987)
 Xou da Xuxa 3 (1988)
 4º Xou da Xuxa (1989)
 Xuxa (1989)
 Xuxa 5 (1990)
 Xou da Xuxa Seis (1991)
 Xuxa (1991)
 Xou da Xuxa Sete (1992)
 Xuxa (1992)
 Xuxa (1993)
 Sexto Sentido (1994)
 El Pequeño Mundo (1994)
 Luz no Meu Caminho (1995)
 Tô de Bem com a Vida (1996)
 Xuxa Dance (1996)
 Boas Notícias (1997)
 Só Faltava Você (1998)
 El Mundo Es de los Dos (1999)
 Xuxa 2000 (1999)
 Só Para Baixinhos (2000)
 Só Para Baixinhos 2 (2001)
 Só Para Baixinhos 3 (2002)
 Só Para Baixinhos 4 (2003)
 Circo (2004)
 Solamente para Bajitos (2005)
 Festa (2005)
 Só Para Baixinhos 7 (2007)
 Só Para Baixinhos 8 (2008)
 Natal Mágico (2009)
 Baixinhos, Bichinhos e + (2010)
 Sustentabilidade (2011)
 É Pra Dançar (2013)
 ABC do XSPB (2016)

Awards and nominations

References

External links

  
 

 
1963 births
Living people
People from Santa Rosa, Rio Grande do Sul
Brazilian people of Italian descent
Brazilian people of Portuguese descent
Brazilian people of Polish descent
Brazilian female models
Brazilian film actresses
Brazilian film producers
Brazilian women film producers
Brazilian songwriters
Brazilian Latin pop singers
Brazilian television actresses
Brazilian television presenters
Brazilian television talk show hosts
Brazilian women philanthropists
Brazilian children's television presenters
Children's songwriters
Latin Grammy Award winners
Latin pop singers
Som Livre artists
Spanish-language singers of Brazil
20th-century Brazilian actresses
21st-century Brazilian actresses
20th-century Brazilian businesspeople
21st-century Brazilian businesspeople
20th-century Brazilian women singers
20th-century Brazilian singers
21st-century Brazilian women singers
21st-century Brazilian singers
Citizens of Italy through descent
Brazilian women television presenters
Association footballers' wives and girlfriends
Racing drivers' wives and girlfriends
Brazilian philanthropists
Women in Latin music
Pelé